The Call of Duty World League Championship 2018 was a Call of Duty: WWII tournament on PlayStation 4 that took place on August 15–19, 2018. The tournament was won by Evil Geniuses with a roster consisting of Patrick "ACHES" Price, Bryan "Apathy" Zhelyazkov, Adam "Assault" Garcia and Justin "SiLLY" Fargo-Palmer after beating Team Kaliber in the Grand Finals.

Last Chance Qualifier
On July 24–25, 2018 32 teams will play for a chance to qualify for the Call of Duty Championship 2018 in Columbus, Ohio at the MLG Arena. Ten teams will be invited via the CWL National Circuit: the Stage 2 winners of the Mexico and Brazil pilot regions, and the Stage 4 winners of the National Circuit leagues from the United States of America, United Kingdom, Canada, France, Italy, Germany, Spain and Australia. Another 22 teams, 14 from North America, 7 from Europe and 1 from the APAC region, will also be invited based on cumulative CWL Pro Points earned. The top 16 teams will qualify for the 2018 Call of Duty Championship.

Last Chance Qualifier teams

Qualified teams

32 teams from the North America, Europe and APAC regions will qualify for the tournament. The 16 teams which qualified for Stage 2 of the 2018 CWL Pro League were the first teams to qualify. Another 16 teams will qualify via the Last Chance Qualifier.

Pro League Teams
The 16 teams which qualified for Stage 2 of the 2018 CWL Pro League were the first teams to qualify for the 2018 Call of Duty Championship.

Last Chance Qualifier teams
The top 16 teams from the Last Chance Qualifier will qualify for the 2018 Call of Duty Championship.

Groups
The draw for the groups took place on 29 July 2018.

Final standings

References

External links

2017 in Los Angeles
2017 in sports in California
2017 first-person shooter tournaments
Call of Duty Championship